Manisha Ganguly (born 13 January 1995) is an investigations correspondent at The Guardian, specialising in Open Source intelligence. She previously worked as investigative documentary producer for the BBC, where she won multiple awards for her work exposing war crimes. She lives in London, United Kingdom.

Career 
While living in Kolkata, Ganguly was the founder and editor of feminist counterculture webzine, Eyezine. The website reported on human rights abuses in Kashmir, and sexual assault by riot police in West Bengal, which resulted in 100,000 readers in one month for the website.

For the BBC, her investigative documentaries exposed double-tap attacks by Russian planes in Syria and war crimes by Turkish-backed forces in the Syrian civil war, foreign meddling, violations of the UN arms embargo, desecration of the bodies of prisoners of war and civilians in Libya, use of cluster munitions in Ukraine, human trafficking in the Middle East, uncovered the training of the killers of journalist Jamal Khashoggi. Ganguly was interviewed about her investigative reporting on Ukraine by El Mundo, ARTE, and L'Orient Le Jour.

She holds a PhD titled "Future of Investigative Journalism: The Age of Automation, A.I. & Open-Source Intelligence (OSINT)" from the University of Westminster.

In 2023, following the Twitter takeover by Elon Musk, Ganguly expressed concern for Twitter becoming "an inhospitable platform for the OSINT community".

Ganguly investigated Team Jorge, a team of Israeli contractors claiming to have meddled in more 30 elections worldwide and Aims, their software to launch bot armies with the Guardian and Forbidden Stories.

Recognition and awards 
Ganguly has won a number of awards for her work including the 2020 George Weidenfeld Special Preis for Courageous Reporting, In April 2021, Ganguly was included by Forbes magazine on their annual 30 Under 30 in the media category. She has also won international awards including One Young World journalist of the year 2022, MHP 30 to watch under 30 in 2021 and 2020, WeAreTechWomen's TechWomen100 2021, Best Investigation at the Asian Media Awards 2021, Outstanding Young Journalist at the Asian Media Awards 2020, and an Amnesty International Media Award.

Ganguly's journalism was shortlisted for the Association of International Broadcasting Young Journalist Award, One World Media Award for Coronavirus Reporting, Outstanding Young Journalist at the Asian Media Awards  in 2020, and for the Broadcast Awards in 2021.

References 

Indian investigative journalists
Indian reporters and correspondents
1995 births
Living people
Indian documentary filmmakers
British investigative journalists
British film producers
The Guardian journalists
British reporters and correspondents
BBC people
British documentary film producers